Marrit Steenbergen (born 11 January 2000) is a Dutch competitive swimmer. She won gold medals in the 100 m and 200 m freestyle events at the 2022 European Championships held in Rome, Italy.

Career
In 2013, Steenbergen competed at the 2013 European Youth Summer Olympic Festival taking 2 silver medals in (50 m freestyle and 100 m freestyle).

In June 2015, 15-year-old Steenbergen competed at the inaugural 2015 European Games in Baku, she won gold in 100 m freestyle ahead of Russia's Arina Openysheva clocking in at 53.97 s. Steenbergen also won five silver medals (in the 50 m freestyle, 200 m freestyle, 4 × 200 m freestyle, 4 × 100 m medley, and 4 × 100 m freestyle). The swimming part of the Games were open to junior only.

Steenbergen went on to represent the Netherlands at the 2015 World Aquatics Championships, competing in two relay events. She won a silver medal on the first day of competition in the women's 4 × 100 m freestyle relay, swimming the second leg in the heats and the third leg in the final. She won another silver medal as part of the mixed 4 × 100 m freestyle, swimming the third leg in the heats. She did not swim in the final, but still received a medal.

At the 2015 European Short Course Championships in December 2015, Steenbergen won her first international championship medal at the senior level in an individual event. She won the bronze medal in the 100-meter individual medley in 59.00 seconds, finishing behind Katinka Hosszú, who broke the world record, and Siobhan-Marie O'Connor.

Steenbergen qualified for the 2016 Summer Olympics in Rio de Janeiro in the 4 × 100 and 4 × 200 meter freestyle relays. In the 4×100 meter freestyle relay the team finished 4th in the final, with Steenbergen swimming the first leg. She also swam the 200 meter individual medley and finished 34th in the heats.

Personal bests

References

External links
 

2000 births
Living people
People from Ooststellingwerf
Sportspeople from Friesland
Dutch female freestyle swimmers
Dutch female medley swimmers
Olympic swimmers of the Netherlands
Swimmers at the 2016 Summer Olympics
European Games gold medalists for the Netherlands
European Games medalists in swimming
Swimmers at the 2015 European Games
European Games silver medalists for the Netherlands
World Aquatics Championships medalists in swimming
European Aquatics Championships medalists in swimming
Medalists at the FINA World Swimming Championships (25 m)
Swimmers at the 2020 Summer Olympics
21st-century Dutch women